Alisher Barotov (born 10 September 1999) is a Tajikistani professional football player who currently plays for FK Khujand.

Career

International
Barotov made his senior team debut on 10 July 2019 against Syria.

Career statistics

International

Statistics accurate as of match played 15 July 2019

References

1999 births
Living people
Tajikistani footballers
Tajikistan international footballers
Association football defenders
Tajikistan Higher League players